Edward Gershour Davenport (1838 – 4 December 1874) was a British Conservative Party politician.

Davenport was elected MP for St Ives in 1874, but died less than a year afterwards.

References

External links

 

Conservative Party (UK) MPs for English constituencies
UK MPs 1874–1880
1838 births
1874 deaths
Members of the Parliament of the United Kingdom for St Ives